Scott Parse (born September 5, 1984) is an American former professional ice hockey winger who played in the National Hockey League with the Los Angeles Kings. He was drafted 174th overall by the Kings in the 2004 NHL Entry Draft.

Playing career

Parse signed a one-year contract with the Los Angeles Kings on July 9, 2009. He played his first NHL game on October 24, 2009, against the Phoenix Coyotes. In the 3rd period of his debut game, Parse recorded his first NHL point with an assist to forward Jarret Stoll who scored on Coyotes goalie Ilya Bryzgalov. His first NHL goal was scored on October 29, 2009, in the 1st period against Andrew Raycroft of the Vancouver Canucks.

On March 29, 2010, Parse scored both goals in a 2–3 loss by the Kings at the hands of the Minnesota Wild. It was Parse's first 2-goal game in the NHL. He scored the following night against the Nashville Predators, a goal which proved to be the game winner, making it 3 goals in 2 games for the Kings.

On May 26, 2010, Parse re-signed with the Kings for 2 years with a cap hit of $900,000 per season. He started the 2010–11 NHL season on the Kings' injured reserve list, missing the first 11 games of the season before returning to game action on November 4, 2010, in a home game against the Tampa Bay Lightning. After only playing 5 games, he was placed on IR and underwent hip surgery to repair his labrum. He was activated from injured reserve on April 23, 2011, after missing 77 regular season games.

Parse made the final roster for the 2011-12 season but was placed on injured reserve on November 9, 2011, due to a lower body injury.

Career statistics

Awards and achievements

References

External links

1984 births
Living people
Albany Devils players
American men's ice hockey centers
Grand Rapids Griffins players
Ice hockey players from Michigan
Los Angeles Kings draft picks
Los Angeles Kings players
Manchester Monarchs (AHL) players
Omaha Mavericks men's ice hockey players
People from Portage, Michigan
Reading Royals players
Stanley Cup champions
Tri-City Storm players
AHCA Division I men's ice hockey All-Americans